Gold(III) oxide (Au2O3) is an inorganic compound of gold and oxygen with the formula Au2O3. It is a red-brown solid that decomposes at 298 °C. 

According to X-ray crystallography, AuO features square planar gold centers with both 2- and 3-coordinated oxides. The four Au-O bond distances range from 193 to 207 picometers. The crystals can be prepared by heating amorphous hydrated gold(III) oxide with perchloric acid and an alkali metal perchlorate in a sealed quartz tube at a temperature of around 250 °C and a pressure of around 30 MPa.

References

External links

Gold(III) compounds
Sesquioxides

Transition metal oxides
Crystals in space group 43